Montmagny station is a Via Rail station in Montmagny, Quebec, Canada. It is a request stop on the Ocean line. It also served the Montreal–Gaspé train until Via Rail suspended service in August 2013 due to poor track conditions.

History
The railway station was built by the Intercolonial Railway in 1881 and enlarged in 1904. The station building features a first storey of brick with arched windows, a second storey of wooden framed construction, and a gambrel roof.

Le Voyageur museum
Le Voyageur - La Gare de Montmagny museum, located in the railway station, tells the story of the people of Montmagny. One wall shows the musicians of Montmagny and musical instruments. There is also an exhibition on stove making, once a big industry in Montmagny.

References

External links

Buildings and structures in Chaudière-Appalaches
Transport in Chaudière-Appalaches
Via Rail stations in Quebec
Montmagny, Quebec
Designated Heritage Railway Stations in Quebec
1881 establishments in Quebec
Railway stations in Canada opened in 1881